Mun Hyeon-jang (born 12 May 1937) is a South Korean basketball player. He competed in the men's tournament at the 1964 Summer Olympics.

References

1937 births
Living people
South Korean men's basketball players
Olympic basketball players of South Korea
Basketball players at the 1964 Summer Olympics
Place of birth missing (living people)
Asian Games medalists in basketball
Asian Games bronze medalists for South Korea
Basketball players at the 1962 Asian Games
Medalists at the 1962 Asian Games